Nine Flags is an album by Cuban composer-arranger Chico O'Farrill featuring performances recorded in 1966 for the Impulse! label.

Reception
The Allmusic review by Scott Yanow awarded the album 3 stars stating "The overall music is quite different from O'Farrill's usual Afro-Cuban jazz outings... None of the individual songs caught on, and the interpretations are usually quite concise, but this LP (which has not yet been reissued) is generally quite fun".

Track listing
All compositions by Chico O'Farrill
 "Live Oak" - 2:41   
 "Patcham" - 4:01   
 "Aromatic Tabac" - 4:17   
 "Dry Citrus" - 3:30   
 "Royal Saddle" - 2:42   
 "Panache" - 2:45   
 "Green Moss" - 4:30   
 "Manzanilla" - 4:23   
 "Clear Spruce" - 3:28   
 "The Lady From Nine Flags" - 3:00  
Recorded in New York City on November 10, 1966 (tracks 2, 3 & 8), November 11, 1966 (tracks 1, 5, 6, & 10) and November 14, 1966 (tracks 4, 7 & 9)

Personnel
Chico O'Farrill - arranger, conductor
Clark Terry - trumpet, flugelhorn
Art Farmer (tracks 1-3, 5, 6, 8 & 10), Bernie Glow (tracks 1, 5, 6, & 10), Jimmy Nottingham (tracks 1, 5, 6, & 10) - trumpet
Harry DiVito (tracks 1, 5, 6, & 10), Urbie Green (tracks 1, 5, 6, & 10), J. J. Johnson (tracks 2-4 & 7-9), Benny Powell (tracks 1, 5, 6, & 10) - trombone 
Julius Watkins - french horn (tracks 1-3, 5, 6, 8 & 10)
Jerry Dodgion (tracks 1, 5, 6, & 10), Joe Firrantello (tracks 1-3, 5, 6, 8 & 10), Eddie Wasserman (tracks 1, 5, 6, & 10), Frank Wess (tracks 1, 5, 6, & 10) - woodwinds
Seldon Powell - tenor saxophone (tracks 2-4 & 7-9)
Larry Coryell - guitar (tracks 4, 7 & 9)
Pat Rebillot - piano (tracks 2-4 & 7-9)
George Duvivier - bass
Gus Johnson (tracks 4, 7 & 9), Don Lamond (tracks 1, 5, 6, & 10), Mel Lewis (tracks 2, 3 & 8) - drums
Carl Hard - percussion (tracks 2, 3 & 8)

References

Impulse! Records albums
Chico O'Farrill albums
1966 albums
Albums produced by Bob Thiele
Albums conducted by Chico O'Farrill
Albums arranged by Chico O'Farrill